Morigerati (Cilentan: Murgirati) is a town and comune in the province of Salerno in the Campania region of south-western Italy.

History
The village was probably founded by the ancient Italic people of the Morgetes. It was later colonized by the Ancient Roman, as witnessed by some ruins in a locality named Rumanuru.

Geography
The municipality, located in southern Cilento and part of its national park, is crossed by the Bussento river. It borders with Casaletto Spartano, Caselle in Pittari, Santa Marina, Torre Orsaia and Tortorella. Its only hamlet (frazione) is the village of Sicilì, that has a population of 364.

Main sights

Bussento Caves, a WWF oasis along Bussento river. It is a nature reserve that includes gorges and caves by the river.
The local Ethnographic Museum

Transport
The town is served by the national highway SS 517/var Padula-Policastro at the exit "Sicilì-Morigerati", 11 km west. The highway links the Cilentan highway to the A3 Motorway.

See also
Cilentan dialect

References

External links

 Morigerati official website
 Ethnographic Museum of Morigerati

Cities and towns in Campania
Localities of Cilento